The Diesel Air Dair 100 is an opposed-piston diesel aircraft engine, designed and produced by Diesel Air Ltd of Olney, Buckinghamshire for use in airships, home-built kitplanes and light aircraft. The prototype was  built in the 1990s and exhibited it at PFA (now LAA) airshows.  Although Diesel Air engines have been fitted  to an AT-10 airship and to a Luscombe 8A monoplane,  production numbers have been very limited.

Design and development
The Dair 100 engine is a twin-cylinder two-stroke, opposed-piston,  displacement, liquid-cooled, diesel engine direct drive design. It produces  at  2500 rpm, with a compression ratio of 18:1. The engine has two cylinders and two crankshafts linked to four pistons, the combustion chamber formed between the crowns of the pistons. There are no poppet valves, each cylinder having a ring of ports at each end.  In this "one-direction (uniflow)" engine these ports, respectively, admit air and expel exhaust gases.  This design eliminates the need for a cylinder head and camshafts. Scavenging is assisted by a centrifugal air pump, the pump also serving to provide a mild supercharging effect. Fitment of an exhaust-driven turbocharger is permissible.

The engine may use either diesel fuel (DERV) or Jet-A1 kerosene (AVTUR). Jet-A1 is more readily available at airfields, but its reduced lubricity (compared to diesel fuel) could mean that additional cylinder lubrication may be required. Fuel is directly injected into each cylinder, pressure being supplied by a hydraulically-governed mechanical fuel pump.

Dry sump lubrication is by high pressure pump delivering oil to plain main bearings and con-rod bearings.

Applications
Advanced Airship Technologies Group AT-10 airship
Luscombe 8A

Specifications (Dair 100)

See also
Zoche aero-diesel

References

External links

Diesel Air aircraft engines
Two-stroke aircraft piston engines
Liquid-cooled aircraft piston engines
2010s aircraft piston engines